G. officinalis may refer to:
 Galega officinalis, an herbaceous plant species
 Gratiola officinalis, an ornamental plant species

See also
 Officinalis